Sakharovka is a rural locality (a khutor) in Kaysatskoye Rural Settlement, Pallasovsky District, Volgograd Oblast, Russia. The population was 15 as of 2010. There is 1 street.

Geography 
Sakharovka is located in steppe, on the Caspian Depression, 45 km south of Pallasovka (the district's administrative centre) by road. Novy is the nearest rural locality.

References 

Rural localities in Pallasovsky District